Pak Kung Au, also known as Tung Chung Gap, Tung Chung Au, is a mountain pass along Tung Chung Road on Lantau Island, Hong Kong.

It is located at the end of Stage 2 and the start of Stage 3 of the Lantau Trail, between Sunset Peak and Lantau Peak.

B-HRX crash
On 26 August 2003, the B-HRX, an EC 155 B1 helicopter from the Government Flying Service crashed at Pak Kung Au. The pilot and the aircrewman were fatally injured. They are buried in Gallant Garden, a cemetery for civil servants who die on duty.

References

External links
 Report on the accident to Eurocopter EC155B1 helicopter

Lantau Island
Gaps of Hong Kong